Jenica Bergere is an American actress known for her roles in Trophy Wife, Bosch, The Drew Carey Show, The Faculty, and others. Bergere has also appeared in the films Safety Not Guaranteed, And Then There Was Eve, Psycho Beach Party, and others.

Filmography

Film

Television

References 

Living people
American film actresses
American television actresses
1974 births
20th-century American actresses
21st-century American actresses